Sir Kenneth McColl Anderson,  (11 October 1909 – 29 March 1985) was an Australian politician.

Early life and career
Anderson was born at sea, off South Australia, when his parents were returning from a visit to Europe.  He was the son of David Anderson (member for Ryde in the New South Wales Legislative Assembly, 1920–1927) and educated at Ryde Public School and Petersham Intermediate Schools in Sydney.  He worked as an insurance clerk, auctioneer, estate agent and property valuer in the Sydney suburb of Eastwood.  He married Madge Merrion in June 1936.  He served in the second Australian Imperial Force during World War II as a lieutenant in the 8th Signals Division in Malaya and was held by the Japanese as a prisoner of war in for three years at Changi Prison and on the Burma Railway.  He was Mayor of Ryde Municipal Council from 1949 to 1950.

Political career

Anderson was elected as the member for Ryde in 1950, representing the Liberal Party, but was defeated at the 1953 election.

Anderson was a Senator for New South Wales, representing the Liberal Party from the 1953 half-senate elections until the dissolution of parliament before the 1975 election.  He was Minister for Customs and Excise from June 1964 until February 1968 and Minister for Supply from February 1968 until August 1971 and Minister for Health from August 1971 until the defeat of the McMahon government at the December 1972 election.

Anderson was made a Knight Bachelor in 1970 and made a Knight Commander of the Order of the British Empire in 1972.  He died in the Sydney suburb of Lane Cove, New South Wales, survived by his wife and a daughter.

Notes

 

 

 

 

Liberal Party of Australia members of the Parliament of Australia
Members of the New South Wales Legislative Assembly
Members of the Australian Senate for New South Wales
Members of the Australian Senate
Members of the Cabinet of Australia
1909 births
1985 deaths
Australian Knights Commander of the Order of the British Empire
Australian Knights Bachelor
Australian politicians awarded knighthoods
Liberal Party of Australia members of the Parliament of New South Wales
World War II prisoners of war held by Japan
Australian Army officers
Australian Army personnel of World War II
Australian auctioneers
Australian prisoners of war
Burma Railway prisoners
20th-century Australian politicians
Mayors of Ryde
Australian Ministers for Health
People born at sea